Luba Jurgenson (born 1 July 1958) is a French-speaking woman of letters.

Her novel Au lieu du péril (2014) earned her the Prix Valery Larbaud in 2015.

Biography 
She was born in Moscow, then-USSR and is of Estonian origin and Russian culture, but emigrated to Paris in 1975 at age 16.

Luba Jurgenson is agrégée in Russian (1997) and holder of a PhD in Slavic Studies (2001). She is a maître de conférences in russian literature at Paris-Sorbonne University. Her field of research is that of the literature of the camps.

After the outbreak of the Russian-Ukrainian war, Jurgenson made anti-war appeals in the French media: "Il faut porter la cause de l’Ukraine à l’Assemblée nationale" https://esprit.presse.fr/actualites/pour-l-ukraine-pour-leur-liberte-et-la-notre/il-faut-porter-la-cause-de-l--a-l-assemblee-nationale-44039

Translations 
Her best known translations are:
1986: Ivan Goncharov, Oblomov, 
1991: Ana Novac, Les Accidents de l'âme
1997-1999, 2003 Nina Berberova, Les Petits Romans, Borodine, Le Cap des tempêtes, Actes Sud,
2004: Leonid Guirchovitch, Apologie de la fuite, Verdier
2009: Vladimir Toporov, Apologie de Pluchkine, Verdier -  2011, for the best translation;
2013: Panteleimon Romanov, Camarade Kisliakov, Éditions Héros-Limite; translation nominated at Prix Russophonie 2015

Works 
 Les Russes et la Traversée du siècle
 Soljenitsyne et le Destin russe
 Le Soldat de papier.
 Une autre vie
 La Dourova
 Boutique de vie
 Moscou
 Le Serpent bleu
 Lettres à un ami, correspondance avec Isaac Glikman
 La Belle de Moscou
 Mère et fils
 Avoir sommeil
 Le Chamane
 Tolstoï
 Éducation nocturne
 L'Autre
 À la recherche de l'argent perdu
 L'expérience concentrationnaire est-elle indicible ?
 Création et Tyrannie : URSS 1917 - 1991
 Au lieu du péril, 2014, Éditions Verdier, Lagrasse, . Prix Valery Larbaud in 2015.

Bibliography
2008: Murielle Lucie Clément, Écrivains franco-russes, Faux titre, 
2007: Axel Gasquet, Écrivains multilingues et écritures métisses…, Presses universitaires Blaise-Pascal, 181-188

Notes

References

External links 
 Luba Jurgenson on M.E.L.
 Luba Jurgenson, à double sens on Libération (7 August 2014)
 Conférence de Luba Jurgenson Le bilinguisme : communiquer avec l’étranger en soi on YouTube 

20th-century French non-fiction writers
21st-century French non-fiction writers
20th-century French women writers
Prix Valery Larbaud winners
Romanian–French translators
Russian–French translators
Soviet emigrants to France
1958 births
Living people
21st-century French women writers